Clarence Everard Calwell (9 September 1896 – 28 September 1975) was an Australian rules footballer who played with Carlton in the Victorian Football League (VFL).

He was the younger brother of George Calwell and served in both World War I and World War II.

Notes

External links 

Clarrie Calwell's playing statistics from The VFA Project
Clarrie Calwell's profile at Blueseum

1896 births
1975 deaths
Australian rules footballers from Melbourne
Carlton Football Club players
Camberwell Football Club players
Australian military personnel of World War I
Australian military personnel of World War II
People from Carlton North, Victoria
Military personnel from Melbourne